The 67th Division was a unit of the Spanish Republican Army that existed during the Spanish Civil War, created on the basis of the mixed brigades. It came to be deployed on the fronts of Teruel, Extremadura and Levante.

History 
The unit was created at the end of August 1937, in Ciudad Real, formed with recruits from 1930, 1937 and 1938. The command fell to the infantry commander Fulgencio González Gómez. The new 67th Division, which was formed by the 215th, 216th and 217th mixed brigades, was integrated into the XX Army Corps. The training and instruction of the new unit lasted until the end of 1937, remaining located in the general reserve.

At the beginning of 1938 it was sent to the Teruel front, to reinforce the units that were already fighting there. After its arrival, it replaced the seriously broken 68th Division. During the subsequent Battle of Alfambra, the unit withstood the bulk of the enemy attack, emerging very broken from the fighting.

It was then sent to the Extremadura front, where it replaced the 45th International Division as the reserve force of the Extremadura Army. In April 1938, two of its brigades, the 216th and 217th, intervened in a small republican offensive in the Talavera de la Reina sector. Until July 1938, the unit remained in Extremadura, when it was replaced by the 68th Division. It was sent as reinforcement to the Levante front, where it was added to XXII Army Corps. Upon arrival, however, the fighting had decreased significantly. During the rest of the war he remained on this front, without taking part in relevant military operations. Towards the end of the war the division was attached to the XIII Army Corps.

Command 
 Commanders
 Infantry Commander Fulgencio González Gómez;

 Commissars
 José Villanueva Márquez, of the CNT;
 Pelayo Tortajada, of the PCE;

 Chiefs of Staff
 Cavalry commander Leopoldo Ortega Nieto;

Order of battle

Notes

References

Bibliography 
 
 
 
 
 
 

 
 

Military units and formations established in 1937
Military units and formations disestablished in 1939
Divisions of Spain
Military units and formations of the Spanish Civil War
Military history of Spain
Armed Forces of the Second Spanish Republic